Laurie Flachmeier Corbelli (born January 28, 1957 in Detroit, Michigan) is a former professional indoor volleyball player. She was the head coach of the Texas A&M Aggies women's volleyball team, a position she had served from 1993 to 2017.

Corbelli is married to John Corbelli, assistant coach of A&M volleyball and the Previous USA Olympic Team, and have two kids Rachel and Russell. They currently reside in College Station, Texas.

Playing career
1975 & 1976 AIAW Division II National Championship, Texas Lutheran
1978-84 United States Women's National Volleyball Team
1978 World Championships
1979 Pan American Games
1980 U.S. Olympic Team (Boycott)
1981 World Cup Competition
1982 World Championships, Bronze Medalist
1983 Pan American Games
1984 U.S. Olympic Team, Silver Medalist
1987-89 Major League Volleyball, San Jose Golddiggers

Awards and honors
1976 Most Valuable Player, National AAU Junior Olympics Championship Tournament
1977 USVBA Rookie of the Year, National Tournament, Hilo, Hawaii
1984 Silver Medalist, 1984 Olympic Games, Los Angeles, Calif.
1987 Most Valuable Player, Major League Volleyball
1987-89 Major League Volleyball All-Star and All-Pro Team
1989 Most Valuable Player, Major League Volleyball All-Star Game
1992 USVBA Player of the Year, National Tournament, Senior Division
Three-time USVBA All-American (1985, 1986, 1992)
1998 USA Volleyball/Flo Hyman All-Time Great Player Award

Coaching career
Corbelli began her head coaching career at the University of San Francisco, where she served from 1986–89. She compiled a 39–71 overall record there. In 1990, she moved to Santa Clara University, accumulating a 61–35 record in three seasons. In 1993, she started coaching at Texas A&M University, and continues to serve as the head coach there.

Coaching honors
1987 West Coast Athletic Conference Women's Volleyball Coach of the Year
1991 West Coast Conference Co-Coach of the Year
1992 West Region Coach of the Year
1992 West Coast Conference Coach of the Year
1994 Southwest Conference Co-Coach of the Year
1995 District VI Coach of the Year
1995 Southwest Conference Coach of the Year
2000 Texas A&M Coach of the Year
2013 Earned 500th Match Win
2015 SEC Coach of the Year
2019 AVCA Hall of Fame Inductee

Other honors
1989 Garland Sports Hall of Fame
1994 Texas Lutheran College Athletic Hall of Honor
1994 NAIA Hall of Fame
1998-2000 Honorary Co-Chair of the Children's Miracle Network for Brazos Valley
2002 USA Volleyball/George L. Fisher "Leader in Volleyball"
2006 L.V. Berkner High School Hall of Honor

References
The Corbelli File

External links
Texas A&M bio

American women's volleyball players
American volleyball coaches
Volleyball players at the 1984 Summer Olympics
Olympic silver medalists for the United States in volleyball
Texas Lutheran University alumni
Texas A&M University faculty
Texas A&M Aggies women's volleyball coaches
1957 births
Sportspeople from Detroit
Living people
Medalists at the 1984 Summer Olympics
San Francisco Dons women's volleyball coaches
Santa Clara Broncos women's volleyball coaches
American women academics
21st-century American women